Richland Township is a township in Vernon County, in the U.S. state of Missouri.

Richland Township was erected in 1855. Some say the township was so named on account of their fertile soil, while others believe the name is a transfer from Richland County, Ohio.

References

Townships in Missouri
Townships in Vernon County, Missouri